Vladimir Viktorovich Kryukov (– 16 August 1959) was a Soviet Army lieutenant general and a Hero of the Soviet Union.

Kryukov joined the Imperial Russian Army after the beginning of World War I, fighting on the Western Front and becoming an officer by his demobilization in December 1917. He commanded a Red Guard detachment during the early stages of the Russian Civil War, but soon transferred to the Red Army. Kryukov commanded cavalry units on the Southern Front, and continued his service during the interwar period. He led a rifle regiment during the Winter War, and after its end became a rifle brigade commander.

Soon after this promotion Kryukov received the rank of major general. In the spring of 1941 he became commander of the 10th Mechanized Corps' 198th Motorized Division. Kryukov led the division during the Leningrad Strategic Defensive in the summer and fall of 1941, in which it was converted into a rifle division. Between January and February 1942 Kryukov commanded the 10th Cavalry Corps. From March of that year he commanded the 2nd Guards Cavalry Corps. Shortly after taking command of the corps, Kryukov met folk singer Lidia Ruslanova, whom he married soon afterwards. He led the corps through the rest of the war, and was awarded the title Hero of the Soviet Union for his leadership in the Vistula–Oder Offensive and the East Pomeranian Offensive.

Postwar, Kryukov became commander of a cavalry school and deputy commander of a rifle corps. In September 1948 he and his wife Lidia Ruslanova were arrested for looting during their time in East Prussia. In November 1951 Kryukov was sentenced to 25 years in the Gulag, and deprived of his rank and decorations. After Stalin died, Kryukov was pardoned, and his rank and decorations were restored. He graduated from courses at the Military Academy of the General Staff and became deputy chief of the Red Army Military Law Academy. Kryukov retired in 1957 and died two years later.

Early life, World War I, and Russian Civil War 
Kryukov was born on 15 July 1897 in Buturlinovka in Voronezh Governorate to a peasant family. In 1914, he graduated from a technical school in Ryazan.

Kryukov volunteered for the Imperial Russian Army in December, after the beginning of World War I. He graduated from a training unit of a reserve regiment in Ryazan and the 2nd Moscow Warrant Officer's School in 1915. From September he fought on the Western Front, initially serving as a platoon commander in the 26th Siberian Rifle Regiment. Kryukov later became head of cavalry intelligence (razvedka) of the 57th Siberian Rifle Regiment.

He was promoted to the rank of Lieutenant and was demobilized in December 1917 after Russia withdrew from World War I.

References 

1897 births
1959 deaths
Burials at Novodevichy Cemetery
People from Buturlinsky District
People from Bobrovsky Uyezd
Communist Party of the Soviet Union members
Soviet lieutenant generals
Imperial Russian Army personnel
Russian military personnel of World War I
Soviet military personnel of the Russian Civil War
Soviet military personnel of the Winter War
Soviet military personnel of World War II
Military Academy of the General Staff of the Armed Forces of the Soviet Union alumni
Heroes of the Soviet Union
Recipients of the Order of Lenin
Recipients of the Order of the Red Banner
Recipients of the Order of Suvorov, 1st class
Recipients of the Order of Kutuzov, 1st class
Recipients of the Order of Suvorov, 2nd class
Recipients of the Virtuti Militari (1943–1989)